Lake Bathurst (Aboriginal: Bundong) is a shallow lake located  south-east of Goulburn, New South Wales in Australia. It is also the name of a nearby locality in the Goulburn Mulwaree Council.

Features and location

The lake was named by surveyor James Meehan in honour of Earl Bathurst, Secretary of State for the Colonies, and the nearby village was named after the lake.

Birds
 The lake is an important site for Australasian shovellers. A  area of the lake and its immediate surrounds has been identified by BirdLife International as an Important Bird Area (IBA) because it regularly supports significant numbers of near threatened blue-billed ducks  and over 1% of the world population of Australasian shovellers.  It is an important drought refuge, sometimes supporting over 1% of the world populations of freckled ducks, black swans, chestnut teals and sharp-tailed sandpipers.

Locality

Lake Bathurst station

Lake Bathurst had a railway station on the Bombala railway line from 1884 to 1975.

Inveralochy station
Another station was established under the name of Inveralochy in the northern part of the locality in 1890 and was closed in 1974.

Military history

During World War II, Lake Bathurst was the location of RAAF No.16 Inland Aircraft Fuel Depot (IAFD), completed in 1942 and closed on 29 August 1944. Usually consisting of 4 tanks, 31 fuel depots were built across Australia for the storage and supply of aircraft fuel for the RAAF and the US Army Air Forces at a total cost of £900,000 ($1,800,000).

References

Further reading
 McDonald, J. Kay. (1985). Exploring the ACT and Southeast New South Wales. Kangaroo Press: Sydney. 

Bathurst
Important Bird Areas of New South Wales
Southern Tablelands
Goulburn Mulwaree Council
Bombala railway line